This is an era-list of yearly standings of the highest level of college football, including NCAA Division I FBS independent schools football standings.

College independents standings

NCAA University Division

NCAA Division I

NCAA Division I-A

NCAA Division I FBS

References

Independents
Standings